Quinone oxidoreductase is an enzyme that in humans is encoded by the CRYZ gene.

Crystallins are separated into two classes: taxon-specific, or enzyme, and ubiquitous. The latter class constitutes the major proteins of vertebrate eye lens and maintains the transparency and refractive index of the lens. The former class is also called phylogenetically-restricted crystallins. This gene encodes a taxon-specific crystallin protein which has NADPH-dependent quinone reductase activity distinct from other known quinone reductases. It lacks alcohol dehydrogenase activity although by similarity it is considered a member of the zinc-containing alcohol dehydrogenase family. Unlike other mammalian species, in humans, lens expression is low. One pseudogene is known to exist.

References

External links

Further reading